Catherine Sunesdotter, (c. 1215 – 1252) was Queen of Sweden from 1244 to 1250 as the wife of King Eric XI of Sweden. In her later years she served as abbess of Gudhem Abbey in Falbygden.

Heir of the Sverker dynasty
Catherine was the eldest daughter of Helena Sverkersdotter and Sune Folkason. Catherine did not have any brothers, but a sister, Benedikte Sunesdotter of Bjelbo. Catherine's maternal grandparents were King Sverker II and Queen Benedicta. Descending from the families of Bjelbo and Sverker, she was a member of one of the Geatish clans. Catherine's father Sune Folkason was Lord of Ymseborg, lawspeaker of Västergötland, and in some literature he is referred to as Earl of the Swedish.

Queen of Sweden
Eric XI (1215–50) of the Eric dynasty became king in 1222 and was exiled by co-king Canute II of Sweden from 1229 to 1234.  Eric returned to Sweden on Canute's death in 1234 and served as king until his own death in 1250. Young Eric was, according to semi-legendary material, physically lame and spoke with a stutter ("läspe och halte"), and he was reportedly of a kindly nature.  Eric and Catherine were married in order to strengthen Eric's claim to the throne, as Catherine was of royal blood on her mother's side. The marriage took place in 1243 or 1244, at Fyrisängen near Uppsala. Catherine had received an immense dower upon the marriage: some legends speak romantically about "half the kingdom".

Since she immediately devoted herself to a sequestered religious life and not to family at Eric's death, the conclusion has tended to be that they did not have any surviving children. His younger half-brother Valdemar Birgersson was chosen as the next King of Sweden.

Queen dowager and abbess
Upon the death of her husband, the now Queen Dowager retreated to Gudhem Abbey. Because Scandinavian customary law dictated that no clan property could be held by a member of a religious order, she transferred some lands, including her queenly dower, to certain relatives and gave others as donations to ecclesiastical institutions. For example, her sister Benedikta received as a gift from her the town of Söderköping. The Queen Dowager soon became the Abbess of Gudhem Abbey, and served in that position until her death in 1252.

References

Further reading
 

|-

1215 births
1252 deaths
Catherine 1234
13th-century Swedish nuns
Swedish Roman Catholic abbesses
Christians of the Second Swedish Crusade
House of Bjelbo
House of Eric